Hugh Cholmeley may refer to:

Sir Hugh Cholmeley, 1st Baronet (1600–1657), English MP for Scarborough
Sir Hugh Cholmeley, 3rd Baronet (c. 1662–1665), of the Cholmeley baronets
Sir Hugh Cholmeley, 4th Baronet (1632–1689), English MP for Northampton and Thirsk
Sir Hugh Cholmeley, 3rd Baronet (1839–1904), British MP for Grantham
Sir Hugh John Francis Sibthorp Cholmeley, 5th Baronet (1906–1964), of the Cholmeley baronets
Sir (Hugh John), Frederick Sebastian Cholmeley, 7th Baronet (born 1968), of the Cholmeley baronets

See also
Cholmeley (surname)
Hugh Cholmondeley (disambiguation)